Dundee North End Football Club are a Scottish junior football club based in the city of Dundee. Formed in 1895 and nicknamed the Dokens, they play their home games at North End Park which has room for around 2,000 spectators and is within the vicinity of the grounds of both Dundee and Dundee United.  Their strip (uniform) colours are maroon and white.

The team have been managed since October 2022 by Former Cardiff City player Kevin McNaughton amd Former Dundee United player Lewis Toshney.

Dundee North End are one of the better junior teams in the Tayside league, but have found it tougher in the East Region, of which they, along with all Tayside clubs, became a part in 2002.

First-team squad

Honours
 SJFA East Region North Division winners: 2017–18
 North & Tayside Cup: 2000–01, 2010–11
 Tayside Premier Division winners: 1997–98
 East Region Tayside Premier winners: 2004–05
 Tayside Division One winners: 1978–79
 Dundee Junior League winners: 1895–96, 1905–06, 1908–09, 1914–15, 1956–57, 1959–60
 DJ Laing Homes League Cup: 1998–99, 2004–05
 Currie (Findlay & Co) Cup: 1989–90
 Intersport Cup: 1988–89
 Perth Advertiser Cup: 1989–90, 1992–93
 Tayside Drybrough Cup: 1983–84, 1985–86
 Tayside Regional Cup: 1989–90
 Courier Cup: 1893–94, 1894–95, 1895–96, 1909–10, 1913–14, 1914–15, 1919–20, 1922–23, 1923–24, 1930–31, 1956–57, 1957–58, 1960–61, 1969–70
 Craig Stephen Cup: 1982–83, 1985–86
 Cream of the Barley Cup: 1975–76, 1980–81

Notable former players
The following players each played in a professional leagues either before or after their time at the club:

 Willie Cook
 Ewan Fenton
 Iain Jenkins
 Alex Forbes
 Hamish McAlpine
 Gordon Smith

References

External links
 Official club site

 
Association football clubs established in 1895
Football clubs in Scotland
Scottish Junior Football Association clubs
Football clubs in Dundee
1895 establishments in Scotland